"On Your Own" is a song by the English rock band the Verve. It was released on their second album, A Northern Soul. It was released on 12 June 1995 as the second single from the album charting at #28 in the UK Singles Chart.

Lyrics
The song appears to be based on the work of The Smiths, using some of their techniques, such as adding major sevenths - and even features a lyric close to the one in "How Soon Is Now?":

"You come in on your own 
and you leave on your own"

This Verve lyric can find easy comparisons with:

"and you stand on your own
and you leave on your own".

Lead singer Richard Ashcroft also recorded an acoustic version of On Your Own that contained only piano and acoustic guitar, in addition to Ashcroft's vocals. The vinyl version is green and features the B-Side I See The Door. A small number of the green vinyl release were misprinted and featured the track "Friends" by Daryll-Ann. Nearly all misprinted copies were destroyed, making it a highly collectable single.

Reception
AllMusic writer Jason Aneky considered "On Your Own" to be a remarkable song, and a highlight on the album.

Music video 
The music video was directed by Jake Scott (son of Ridley Scott) and features the band performing on a foggy street.

Track listings

 CD HUTCD 55
On Your Own
I See the Door
Little Gem
Dance On Your Bones

 Cassette HUTC 55
On Your Own
I See the Door

 7" HUT 55
On Your Own
I See the Door

US version
In 1995 On Your Own was released for the American market - with a different track listing. The single was distributed by American label Vernon Yard Recordings.
 CD Promo DPRO-12747 
On Your Own

References

External links
 Official discography webpage

The Verve songs
1995 singles
Hut Records singles
1995 songs
Songs written by Nick McCabe
Songs written by Richard Ashcroft
Songs written by Simon Jones (musician)
Songs written by Peter Salisbury
Music videos directed by Jake Scott (director)